is the 11th single by Japanese idol girl group Nogizaka46. It was released on March 18, 2015. It debuted in number one on the weekly Oricon Singles Chart, and as of May 25, 2015 (issue date), has sold 605,529 copies. It also reached number one on the Billboard Japan Hot 100.

Release 
This single was released in 4 versions. Type-A, Type-B, Type-C and a regular edition. Type-C includes the undergroup member's song. The center position in the choreography for the title song is held by Nanase Nishino.

Track listing

Type-A

Type-B

Type-C

Regular

Chart and certifications

Weekly charts

Year-end charts

Certifications

References

Further reading

External links
 Discography  on Nogizaka46 Official Website  
 Music Video
  
  
  
  
 Bonus Movie
 Nogizaka46 Movie Digest on YouTube 
 Tie-up
  
 CM Gallery - Palty 

2015 singles
2015 songs
Japanese-language songs
Nogizaka46 songs
Oricon Weekly number-one singles
Billboard Japan Hot 100 number-one singles
Songs with lyrics by Yasushi Akimoto